Veszprém is a district in central-eastern part of Veszprém County. Veszprém is also the name of the town where the district seat is found. The district is located in the Central Transdanubia Statistical Region.

Geography 
Veszprém District borders with Zirc District to the north, Várpalota District and Balatonalmádi District to the east, Balatonfüred District to the south, Tapolca District, Ajka District and Pápa District to the west. The number of the inhabited places in Veszprém District is 19.

Municipalities 
The district has 1 urban county, 1 town and 17 villages.
(ordered by population, as of 1 January 2013)

The bolded municipalities are cities.

See also
List of cities and towns in Hungary

References

External links
 Postal codes of the Veszprém District

Districts in Veszprém County